William Prentice Cooper (September 27, 1870 – July 3, 1961) was an American lawyer and politician. He served as the Speaker of the Tennessee House of Representatives.

Early life
William Prentice Cooper was born on September 27, 1870. He graduated from Vanderbilt University in 1890, where he was a member of Sigma Alpha Epsilon.

Career
Cooper was a lawyer. He served as the Mayor of Shelbyville, Tennessee from 1905 to 1907. He also served as the Speaker of the Tennessee House of Representatives from 1915 to 1917.

Cooper served on the board of trustees of the University of Tennessee from 1915 to 1958.

Personal life
Cooper married Argentine Shofner. Their son, Prentice Cooper, served as the 39th Governor of Tennessee from 1939 to 1945. They resided at the Gov. Prentice Cooper House in Shelbyville, built in 1904 for them, and based on the design of a house he owned in Henderson, Kentucky. His wife inherited the Absalom Lowe Landis House, also known as Beech Hall, in Normandy, Tennessee, where the Coopers summered.

Death and legacy
Cooper died on July 3, 1961. His grandson, Jim Cooper, is a member of the United States House of Representatives.

References

External links

Picture of tomb with bibliographic information

1870 births
1961 deaths
People from Shelbyville, Tennessee
Vanderbilt University alumni
American lawyers
Speakers of the Tennessee House of Representatives
Mayors of places in Tennessee
Cooper family
People from Bedford County, Tennessee